Chasmina tibialis is a moth of the family Noctuidae. It is found from Africa, Asia and from Australia, New Caledonia and Fiji to central Polynesia.

The wingspan is about 40 mm.

The larvae have been recorded on Malvaceae species, including Commersonia bartramia, Grewia and Hibiscus species.

References 

Hadeninae
Moths of Africa
Moths of Madagascar
Moths of Réunion
Moths of Seychelles
Moths described in 1775
Taxa named by Johan Christian Fabricius